Ye'kuana, also known as Maquiritari, Dekwana, Ye'kwana, Ye'cuana, Yekuana, Cunuana, Kunuhana, De'cuana, De’kwana Carib, Pawana, Maquiritai, Maquiritare, Maiongong, or Soto is the language of the Ye'kuana people of Venezuela and Brazil. It is a Cariban language. It is spoken by approximately 5,900 people (c. 2001) around the border of northwestern Brazilian state of Roraima and Venezuela – the majority (about 5,500) in Venezuela. At the time of the 2001 Venezuelan census, there were at 6,523 Ye’kuana living in Venezuela. Given the unequal distribution of the Ye’kuana across two South American countries, Ethnologue lists two different vitality ratings for Ye’kuana: in Venezuela it is listed as Vigorous (6a), while in Brazil it is classified Moribund (8a) on the Graded Intergenerational Disruption Scale (GIDS).

History
In Brazil, the Ye’kuana are believed to have settled on the lands they now occupy more than a century ago, coming from the larger population centres in Venezuela. Traditional mythology and oral history, however, tells that the lands around the Auari and Uraricoera rivers have long been travelled by the Ye’kuana.

During the 18th century, there was a lot of missionary activity in Ye'kuana territory, during which they were forced into constructing forts for the Spanish, and coerced into converting to Catholicism. A rebellion was organised against the Spanish in 1776. The 20th century brought a new wave of exploitation in the form of the colonists looking to capitalise on the discovery of rubber. Whole villages were forced into labour, driven in chain gangs to the rubber camps. Later, another wave of missionaries arrived around the early 1960s. The Brazilian Ye'kuana decided not to live in the missions established on that side of the border, because the missionaries’ attention in Brazil was focused on the Sanumá and not on them. They were also more reluctant to convert, having seen their Venezuelan cousins convert and become (from the Brazilian Ye'kuana perspective) culturally weaker as a result, giving up key elements of their traditional ways of life. On the Venezuelan side of the border, this wave of missionaries brought the establishment of health services, schools, and access to local markets, also creating several relatively large communities centred around the missions.

In 1980, a married Canadian missionary couple came to live among the Ye’kuana for a while, but they did not like their way of life, and there were disagreements between them and the Ye’kuana, and they left. After this, the Brazilian Ye’kuana decided that they did not want religion, but they did want a school, seeing the benefits that that infrastructure had provided indigenous communities in Venezuela. They got one, after negotiating with the leader of the Evangelical Mission of Amazônas. So began a process of becoming sedentary, wherein the Ye’kuana all moved closer together, and established semi-regular schedules (including that certain times of day for children were set aside for school). This establishment of solid permanent contact also led to more far-reaching mobilisation and contact with other indigenous communities and the state of Roraima. The Ye’kuana became known as skilled canoe makers and manioc scrapers, all while remaining fairly removed from the intense river traffic and influx of outsiders that had harmed many other indigenous communities.

Typology
The Ye’kuana language is situated typologically in the Cariban family, which is subdivided into seven subfamilies and one uncategorised language. Ye’kuana is a member of the Guianan Carib subfamily, along with ten other languages. The Guianan languages are located, for the most part, around the Guiana Shield. Ye’kuana and Wayumara form a smaller category within the Guianan subfamily, the Maquiritari-Wayumara subfamily.

Literature
The first documentations of Ye’kuana in the nineteenth century consist of several wordlists by Schomburgk, followed by several comparative and ethnographic works. The early twentieth century saw more wordlists, moving away from works more generally about the Cariban languages to more specifically focusing on Ye’kuana. Escoriaza (1959 and 1960) provided a grammatical sketch. The 1960s and 70s mostly saw work on the ethnography of the Ye’kuana, including their mythology, political structure, and village formation. Schuster 1976 published a wordlist within his ethnography, but otherwise there was not much linguistic study in that time period. Heinen (1983–1984) published a grammar sketch couched in his mostly ethnographic study; Guss (1986) includes some texts in the language in his publication on oral tradition; and Hall (1988) published two volumes on morphosyntax and discourse analysis. Later, Hall (1991) looked at transitivity in verbs, amid many more ethnographic studies, and Chavier (1999) studied some further aspects of the morphology. A dictionary was published on CD-ROM, and most recently, Natália Cáceres’ MA thesis is a brief overview of the sociolinguistic profile of the Ye'kuana, while her doctoral dissertation presents a more complete descriptive grammar. Coutinho (2013) has also explored the number system of Ye'kuana, from a typological perspective.

Phonology

At the beginning of a word, and after a glottal stop, /ɾ̠/ becomes [d], /j/ is in free variation with [ɟ], and /h/ becomes [hʷ] ~ [ɸ]; this last change also happens following /o/, /u/, or /w/.

All consonants except the glottal stop /ʔ/ can be found geminated; it is unclear what phonetic environments allow gemination, and similarly unclear whether a distinction exists between geminated consonants and sequences of glottal stop plus consonant. The phoneme /k/ is commonly labialized to [kʷ] when geminated or preceded by /ʔ/, /o/, /u/, or /w/, and occasionally also after /n/ [ŋ].

The glottal stop /ʔ/ is always treated as part of the syllable coda for the purposes of assigning stress (see below) and can also be realized as laryngealization (creaky voice) on the preceding vowel.

Nasals become [ŋ] before /k/, /w/, and /ʔ/, [ɲ] after /i/ and /j/, and [m] before /h/; in this last case the /h/ also assimilates to become an unvoiced [m̥]. Any nasal can cause nasalization of a preceding short vowel.

Most consonants palatalize in various ways after /i/ and /j/: /t/ and /k/ become [tʃ], /s/ becomes [ʃ], /h/ becomes [ç], nasals become [ɲ], /w/ and /ɾ̠/ ordinarily become [j], and /ɾ̠/ becomes [tʃ] in certain special cases (at the right border of a word, or sometimes as part of the possessive suffix -dü).

Syllables have a (C)V(ː/C) structure. Long vowels cannot occur in closed syllables. Syllables codas can only be /w/, /j/, /ʔ/, or a nasal, and the final syllable of a word can only have coda /w/ or /j/ (or no coda at all).

There are two separate accentual systems operating simultaneously. One deals with vowel length and is iambic in nature: it causes the vowel in every short-vowelled open syllable preceded by a short-vowelled open syllable to lengthen, applied recursively from the start of the word. Thus, some long vowels are unpredictable and phonemic, while others can be fully predicted by the vowel lengthening rule; writing systems differ in choosing to represent either only the first type or both types as long. This rule does not apply to bisyllabic words, whose vowel lengths seem irregular, and it also does not affect the final syllables of longer words, which show no length distinction. The second accentual system deals with pitch and is simpler: in words without attached clitics, a high pitch tends to fall on the penultimate syllable.

Some dialectal variation is found. In some areas speakers (particularly younger city-dwellers) merge /ʃ/ into /s/. A Ye'kwana and De'kwana dialect are sometimes differentiated, where some words that have /j/ in Ye'kwana have /ɾ̠/ instead in De'kwana. Sequences of /wɾ̠/ [wɾ̠] ~ [wɾ̠ʷ] ~ [ɾ̠ʷ] in De'kwana also correspond to /ɾ̠ɾ̠/ [dd] in Ye'kwana, and some vowels differ.

Orthography
Several different orthographies are in use. In Venezuela, the one in widest official use was devised in the 1970s according to the conventions of the Venezuelan Indigenous Languages Alphabet (ALIV) (with some later modifications). It has been widely adopted by speakers in the state of Bolívar. Earlier orthographies designed by missionaries still see some usage, however, and speakers in Brazil and in the Venezuelan state of Amazonas in particular often use a somewhat different system.

Vowels
In the standard orthography used in Venezuela, /ɨ/ is written , and /ə/ is written . Long vowels are indicated by doubling the letter. As discussed under Phonology above, orthographies all represent phonemic long vowels as long, but differ on whether to represent non-phonemic long vowels as long or short.

 [a] - a
 [ə] - ö (Venezuelan standard), ä (Brazil and Amazonas)
 [e] - e
 [i] - i
 [o] - o
 [ɨ] - ü (Venezuelan standard), ö (Brazil and Amazonas)
 [u] - u
 [aː] - aa
 [əː] - öö (Venezuelan standard), ää (Brazil and Amazonas)
 [eː] - ee
 [iː] - ii
 [oː] - oo
 [ɨː] - üü (Venezuelan standard), öö (Brazil and Amazonas)
 [uː] - uu

Consonants
 [t͡ʃ] - ch
 [ɾ̠]~[d] - d
 [ð]~[d] (only found in De'kwana dialect) - d (Venezuelan standard), dh (Brazil and Amazonas)
 [hʷ]~[ɸ] - j (Venezuelan standard), f (Brazil and Amazonas)
 [h] - j
 [ç] - j (Venezuelan standard), jh (Brazil and Amazonas)
 [k] - k
 [kʷ] - kw
 [m] - m
 [n] - n
 [ɲ] - ñ (Venezuela), nh (Brazil)
 [ŋ] - n before k, w, or '; elsewhere, n' (Venezuelan standard) or ng (Brazil and Amazonas)
 [s] - s
 [ʃ] - sh, s
 [t] - t
 [ʔ] - '
 [w] - w at the start of a syllable, u at the end
 [j]~[ɟ] - y at the start of a syllable, i at the end

Morphology

Ye’kuana's morphology is comparable to that of other Cariban languages. Ye'kuana makes use of the following major grammatical aspects: past and non-past. The 'past' aspect is subdivided into recent and distant (the much more used of the two) as well as perfective and imperfective. The 'non-past' is used for present, near future, and general truths. As well, probable and definite future aspects are morphologically distinct, there is a distinct imperfective suffix, and the iterative, durative (past), inchoative, terminative aspects are all marked, the latter three being marked periphrastically, rather than with a suffix like the others.

Pronouns

The first person plural is represented by three forms in Ye'kuana: a dual inclusive form küwü, a dual exclusive form nña, and a plural inclusive form künwanno. There is no plural exclusive form.

Derivational morphology
There is an extensive and productive derivation system, including nominalising, verbalising, and adverbialising suffixes. The system of nominalisation allows for adverbs to be converted, for instance judume ‘black’ becomes judum-ato ‘that which is black’, eetö ‘here’ becomes eeto-no ‘that which is here’, etc.; it also has many varieties of verbal nominalisation: intransitivisation, participlisation, agentivisation (önöö ‘eat (meat)’ becomes t-önöö-nei ‘eater of meat’), deverbal nominalisation of action, instrumental (a’deuwü ‘talk’ gives w-a’deuwü-tojo ‘telephone’), and nominalisation of a participle. In terms of verbalisation, there is the benefactive ‘give N to someone, bring N to something’, such as a’deu ‘language, word’ becoming a’deu-tö ‘read, repeat’; its reverse, the privative (womü ‘clothes’ -> i-womü-ka ‘undress someone); a general verbalisation suffix -ma; -nö which can be used to make transitive verbs; -ta which can be used to make intransitive verbs such as vomit and speak; and the occasional suffixes -dö, -wü, and -’ñö. Finally, the adverbialising suffixes include: nominal possessive, participial, abilitive, a form that indicates the destination of a movement, one indicating aptitude, indicating newness of action, potential, and deverbal negative.

Aspects

Future
The probable future aspect is indicated with the suffix -tai, composed of the future marker -ta and the irrealis marker -i. It does not occur frequently in the elicited data in Cáceres (2011), and it indicates an event for which a probability of its taking place exists, without certainty.  The certain future is likewise rarely marked in spontaneous speech. Examples of the probable future given in the grammar include phrases that translate to “you will learn the Ye'kuana language” and “tomorrow it will become red”, contrasted with the certain future examples: “another day I will come and I will see you” (where the second verb is the one marked).

Valency marking
The language presents several strategies for changing the valency of a verb, primarily a detransitiviser prefix and several causativiser suffixes.

Detransitive 
The base form detransitiviser is postulated to have the form öt-, and has eight allomorphs: öt-, ö-, ö’-, ot-, o’-, o-, at-, and a-.

Transitive verb roots beginning (at the surface level) with e take the detransitive prefix öt-:

Transitive roots beginning with o, or with e where the second vowel is [+round] take ot-:

Transitive roots beginning with a take at-:

For the most part, the patterning of the allomorphs is phonologically-based, however, some roots have slight differences in meaning depending on the allomorph they receive:

Causative 

All classes of verb in Ye’kuana can receive a causative suffix, but each of the two types of intransitive verbs (termed UP and UA) has their own suffix that they take. Intransitive verbs of type UP can take the suffixes -nüjü (with allomorphs -mjü and -nü’) and -nöjü (with allomorphs -mjü and -nö’), and the result is a transitive verb:
{| class="wikitable"
!Intransitive
!English
!Transitive
!English
|- align="left"
|ünükü
|'sleep' 
|nün-nöjü
|'make sleep'
|- align="left"
|seedeta
|'dry'
|sedena-mjü
|'make dry'
|- align="left"
|edenna
|'stop'
|edenna-mjü
|'finalise something'
|}

Transitive verbs and intransitive verbs of type UA can take the causative suffix -jo. In the case of transitive verbs, another argument is added to the valency of the verb, while intransitives maintain their initial valency. This suffix is used relatively rarely with intransitive verbs, and of all the examples given below begin with /e/, so it is theorised that these verbs take this suffix because they are derived from transitives, however this theory has not been proven.
{| class="wikitable"
!Base form
!English
!Causative
!English
|- align="left"
|e'wa'tö
|'to help oneself'
|e'wa'to-jo
|'to be helped'
|- align="left"
|eja'ka
|'to leave'
|ja'ka-jo
|'to be expelled'
|- align="left"
|eta'jü
|'to calm down'
|eta'jü-jo
|'to calm oneself down'
|- align="left"
|e'ji
|'to wash oneself'
|e'ji-jo
|'to be washed'
|}

Plurality
All unmarked nouns in Ye’kuana can be understood semantically as singular or "general" in number, while some nouns can receive explicit plural marking that distinguishes them from the singular/general-numbered nouns. Ye’kuana generally uses the suffix =komo to mark the nominal plural. Cáceres (2011) treats this suffix as a generic plural, while other authors such as Coutinho (2013) subscribe to the analysis given to other Cariban languages that they distinguish in number between the ‘all’ (i.e. collective) and ‘less-than-the-total’ (i.e. non-collective), and therefore treats this morpheme as a collective morpheme. After high-front vowel [i] and approximant [j], the palatalised variant =chomo is also seen. This suffix is used likewise for animate nouns and inanimate nouns:

However, there are some restrictions on the distribution of this morpheme, for instance that names of animals cannot take it:

In the Caura dialect studied by Cáceres (2011), a few other nouns exist that some speakers consider ungrammatical with the plural suffix, but others do not:

However, in the Auaris dialect, as examined by Coutinho (2013), the plural forms of these nouns and others were all accepted:

Even in the Auaris dialect, certain nouns denoting fruit do not accept the plural marker:

{|
|*faduudu=komo
|'several bananas'
|-
|*sokwa=komo
|'several sokwas'
|-
|*ashiichadu
|'several canes'
|}

References

External links 
 ELAR archive of Documentation of Ye'kwana

Languages of Venezuela
Languages of Brazil
Cariban languages